The Saudi Mabahith (General Investigation Directorate), also spelled Mabaheth, is the secret police agency of the Presidency of State Security in Saudi Arabia, and deals with domestic security and counter-intelligence. 

The officers of the Mabahith have delegated powers to investigate, survey, and detain individuals who are deemed to be "threats to national security". The Mabahith has conducted  a wide variety of security operations that have led to the arrest of high profile terrorists, and opposition members that caused internal unrest. Officially, the Mabahith are to turn over arrested individuals to the Saudi courts for sentencing. The Mabahith have been used by the government of Saudi Arabia to monitor political opposition and individuals they deem to be threatening to Saudi society. The organization has been criticized by the United Nations, Amnesty International, and Human Rights Watch.

Role

According to Human Rights Watch, the Mabahith "monitors suspected political opponents and others, targets individuals for arrest, and interrogates detainees. Mabahith agents operate with impunity and have been responsible for a wide range of human rights abuses, including  arbitrary arrest, incommunicado detention, and torture" including waterboarding, denailing, flagellation and beatings, amongst other forms of severe abuse.

Members of the Mabahith were allegedly responsible for the torture of Western detainees arrested during a car bombing campaign which started in 2000. Two members in particular, Khalid al-Saleh and Ibrahim al-Dali, were named by William Sampson in his court action against the Saudi government. Sampson and others lost their case in the UK High Court when the Saudis used the State Immunity Act 1978 as their defence.

Prisons

Al-Ha'ir Prison
Al-Ha'ir Prison is a Mabahith-affiliated prison. The Mabahith have conducted classified interviews as well as interrogations of high profile Al-Qaeda members being held in the prison.

ʽUlaysha Prison
Mabahith runs the ʽUlaysha Prison in Riyadh, where it holds prisoners under arbitrary detention. The United Nations Working Group on Arbitrary Detention has objected to arbitrary detention at Mabahith's prison. , arbitrarily detained prisoners apparently include five founding members of a would-be political party, the Umma Islamic Party, and Khaled al-Johani, who publicly protested in Riyadh on the 11 March "Day of Rage" during the 2011 Saudi Arabian protests. Political prisoners living in exile have testified that Mabahith agents used illegal interrogation methods and tortured political dissidents who were being held arbitrarily in the prison.

Dhahban Central Prison
Dhahban Central Prison is used for arbitrary detention. According to the Human Rights Watch report, women activists – who have been detained since May 2018 – were taken to Dhahban and tortured in a room called an “officer’s guesthouse”. Reportedly, the men who tortured these women were from “cyber security” – a reference to officers working under Saud al-Qahtani, who was fired for his involvement in the killing of journalist Jamal Khashoggi.

See also

 General Intelligence Presidency (Al Mukhabarat Al A'amah) – Saudi Arabian external security agency
 Presidency of State Security

References

External links
 Official website

Saudi Arabian intelligence agencies
1924 establishments in Saudi Arabia
Saudi Arabia
Secret police
2011–2012 Saudi Arabian protests
Organizations of the Arab Spring